Roman Władysław Odzierzyński (28 February 1892, Lviv – 9 July 1975, London) was the 35th Prime Minister of Poland and 5th  prime minister in the Polish Government in Exile from 1950 until 1953.

Following the Invasion of Poland, he fled with the army through Romania to France. He served as an artillery commander with the Polish Army in the East and the Polish II Corps, rising to the rank of brigadier general.

External links
 Generals.dk

1892 births
1975 deaths
Politicians from Lviv
Odzierzynski, Roman
Interior ministers of Poland
Rada Trzech
Military personnel from Lviv
Polish emigrants to the United Kingdom
Polish generals